Rose Hemingway (née Sezniak or Szczesniak; born January 1, 1984) is an American actress, performer and singer, known for performing in musical theatre productions.

Early life 
Hemingway was born and raised in Philadelphia, with "strict Catholic" parents. Hemingway, the sixth child of nine total siblings, recalls growing up around musicals:

Hemingway attended Mount Saint Joseph Academy, an all-girls prep school just outside Philadelphia. A gymnast, she performed in multiple amateur theatre roles at the local community center, including adaptations of Peter Pan, Alice in Wonderland, and The Lion, the Witch and the Wardrobe. She joined The Rainbow Company, a youth theatre company in Philadelphia, with whom she performed across the city. Hemingway said that she "was a member of that company for most of my high school years, and I think it was there that I realized that I really wanted to pursue it professionally."

Career 
Her first acting credit after graduating from Catholic University of America was the lead role in the Theatreworks national tour of Junie B. Jones, which also played off-Broadway in 2006.

In 2008, she starred as the character Sophie Sheridan in the second national tour of Mamma Mia!, which had begun in Toronto, Canada, in June 2003; Hemingway left the cast in February 2009.

International and regional theatre credits include The Snow Queen (Gerda/Ensemble) at the Prince Music Theatre, A Funny Thing Happened on the Way to the Forum (Philia) at Center Stage, and Into the Woods (Cinderella) at the Annenberg Center.

Hemingway appeared in the Los Angeles transfer of the Donmar Warehouse production of the musical Parade, portraying Lila/Mary Phagan. Directed by Rob Ashford, the musical played at the Mark Taper Forum, Los Angeles, in September 2009, for a run through November 15, 2009.

She starred as Rosemary Pillkington in the 2011 Broadway revival of How to Succeed in Business Without Really Trying, also directed by Parade'''s Rob Ashford. After previews from February 26, the show opened on March 27, 2011, at the Al Hirschfeld Theatre, with Hemingway appearing alongside Daniel Radcliffe, Darren Criss, John Larroquette, Tammy Blanchard, Christopher J. Hanke, and Mary Faber. Steven Suskin in Variety wrote, "Newcomer Rose Hemingway is a delicious Rosemary, displaying sweet innocence mixed with an underlying sense of just what is going on in this '60s world of big business." Entertainment Weekly called her "sweet-voiced" and "button-cute". For her performance, Hemingway is a recipient of a Theatre World Award.

 Personal life 
In November 2010, she married actor Geoffrey Hemingway, who had also appeared in the national tour of Mamma Mia!''

References

External links 

American musical theatre actresses
Living people
1984 births
American stage actresses
21st-century American actresses
20th-century American actresses
Actresses from Philadelphia
American women singers
Catholic University of America alumni
Theatre World Award winners